Olethreutes coruscana is a moth of the family Tortricidae. It is found in North America, where it has been recorded from Alberta, Illinois, Indiana, Iowa, Kansas, Kentucky, Maine, Manitoba, Maryland, Massachusetts, New Hampshire, New Jersey, North Carolina, Ohio, Ontario, Vermont and Virginia.

The wingspan is 14–16 mm. Adults are mainly one wing from May to July.

References

Moths described in 1860
Olethreutini